GIR may refer to:

Places 
 Gir, Qom, in Qom Province, Iran
 Gir Forest National Park, in Gujarat, India

Other uses 
 Gir (cattle), a breed 
 GIR (Invader Zim), a character in the animated series
 Games in relief, a baseball statistic
 Geographic information retrieval
 Great Indian Rock, a music festival in India
 Independent Grouping for Reflection, a former CAR political party
 Jean Giraud (1938–2012), French comics artist
 Vandu language, spoken in Ha Giang Province, Vietnam
 Santiago Vila Airport,  Girardot, Cundinamarca, Colombia
 Green in regulation; see Glossary of golf

See also
 Gyr (disambiguation)